The Joint Special Forces Aviation Wing (JSFAW) is a Royal Air Force (RAF) and British Army joint service organisation that coordinates the provision of aviation support to the United Kingdom Special Forces.

The wing is under the peacetime command of the Station Commander of RAF Odiham. However the Army and RAF retain full command of their respective personnel.

History
The wing was established on 2 April 2001 to unite No. 657 Squadron of the Army Air Corps (AAC), which operated the Westland Lynx AH9 helicopter, and the Royal Air Force's No. 7 Squadron, which operated the Boeing Chinook HC2 helicopter, under the one command.

In 2006, No. 651 Squadron AAC was reformed at RAF Odiham to operate the fixed-wing Britten-Norman Defender 4000, and incorporated into the wing. In July 2008, the squadron relocated to RAF Aldergrove, as part of 5 Regiment AAC.

In 2008, No. 8 Flight AAC, which operated a covert fleet of military registered Eurocopter AS365N3 Dauphin II helicopters in civilian livery was incorporated into the wing. In September 2013, the flight was re-designated as No. 658 Squadron.

In May 2018, No. 657 Squadron AAC was disbanded following the retirement of the Lynx on 31 January 2018, with budget cuts precluding the purchase of replacement helicopters for the squadron's fleet. It was reported that an Army Air Corps Special Forces Flight of between two and four AgustaWestland Wildcat helicopters, named the Special Forces Wildcat Flight, would be established.

The wing has a charitable affiliation with the Worshipful Company of Curriers in the City of London.

Structure
The composition of the wing and its aircraft is as follows:

 Headquarters Joint Special Forces Aviation Wing (RAF Odiham, Hampshire)
No. 7 Squadron RAF (RAF Odiham, Hampshire)
 Boeing Chinook HC6
No. 658 Squadron AAC (Stirling Lines, Herefordshire)
Eurocopter AS365N3 Dauphin II

See also 
 United Kingdom Joint Helicopter Command
 U.S. Army Special Operations Aviation Command
 U.S. Air Force Special Operations Command
 Australian Army 6th Aviation Regiment
 Canadian 427 Special Operations Aviation Squadron
 French 4th Special Forces Helicopter Regiment
 Italian 3rd Special Operations Helicopter Regiment

Notes

References

Army Air Corps (United Kingdom)
2001 establishments in the United Kingdom
Joint military units and formations of the United Kingdom
Military units and formations established in 2001
Organisations based in Hampshire
Special forces of the United Kingdom